Gabriel Béchir (24 October 1927 – 18 December 2001) was a French film set decorator. He was nominated for an Academy Award in the category Best Art Direction for the film The Longest Day.

Selected filmography
 Le Tracassin or Les Plaisirs de la ville (1961)
 The Longest Day (1962)

References

External links

1927 births
2001 deaths
French set decorators